The 1957 Central Michigan Chippewas football team represented Central Michigan College, renamed Central Michigan University in 1959, in the Interstate Intercollegiate Athletic Conference (IIAC) during the 1957 NCAA College Division football season.  In their seventh season under head coach Kenneth Kelly, the Chippewas compiled a 4–6 record (4–2 against IIAC opponents) and were outscored by their opponents by a combined total of 222 to 220.

The team's statistical leaders included Herb Kipke with 511 passing yards and Walter Beach with 1,084 rushing yards and 313 receiving yards. Guard Gordon Rinquist received the team's most valuable player award. Three Central Michigan players (Beach, Rinquist, and fullback Theo Winieckie) received first-team honors on the All-IIAC team.

Schedule

References

Central Michigan
Central Michigan Chippewas football seasons
Central Michigan Chippewas football